Björn Arne Tidland (born 4 March, 1963) is a Swedish politician of the Sweden Democrats who since 2022 has been a member of the Riksdag representing the constituency of Gothenburg Municipality.

Tidland holds a master's degree in mechanical engineering from Chalmers Institute of Technology and worked as a designer at Semcon.

He is a municipal councilor and board member for the Sweden Democrats in Gothenburg where he also serves as the party's spokesman on culture on the council and is a member of the council's cultural committee. For the 2022 Swedish general election, Tidland was elected to parliament to represent Gothenburg Municipality.

See also 

 List of members of the Riksdag, 2022–2026

References 

1963 births
Members of the Riksdag from the Sweden Democrats
21st-century Swedish politicians
Living people
Members of the Riksdag 2022–2026